The 2015 Nigerian Senate election in Rivers State was held on 28 March 2015, to elect members of the Nigerian Senate to represent Rivers State. Andrew Uchendu representing Rivers East, Magnus Ngei Abe representing Rivers South East and Otelemaba Amachree representing Rivers West all won on the platform of All Progressives Congress.

Overview

Summary

Results

Rivers East 
All Progressives Congress candidate Andrew Uchendu won the election, defeating People's Democratic Party candidate George Thompson Sekibo and other party candidates.

Rivers South East 
All Progressives Congress candidate Magnus Ngei Abe won the election, defeating People's Democratic Party candidate Olaka Nwogu and other party candidates.

Rivers West 
All Progressives Congress candidate Otelemaba Amachree won the election, defeating People's Democratic Party candidate Osinakachukwu Ideozu and other party candidates.

References 

2015 Rivers State elections
March 2015 events in Nigeria
Riv
Rivers State Senate elections